Karim Bavi (30 December 1964 – 7 December 2022) was an Iranian footballer who played as a striker.

Club career
Bavi played most of his career for Shahin FC, before moving to another Iranian club Persepolis FC.

International career
Bavi debuted for Iran on 28 May 1986 against China. He scored 8 goals in 20 official games for his country. In addition, in 1987 he scored 1 goal in 2 matches during the qualification for the 1988 Olympic Games.

Death
Bavi died on 7 December 2022, aged 57.

Honours
 Tehran Football League top scorer: 1985 with 9 goals
 Qods League top scorer: 1985 with 19 goals

References

External links
Karim Bavi at TeamMelli.com

1964 births
2022 deaths
People from Abadan, Iran
Sportspeople from Khuzestan province
Iranian footballers
Association football forwards
Iran international footballers
Shahin FC players
Persepolis F.C. players
1988 AFC Asian Cup players
Footballers at the 1986 Asian Games
Asian Games competitors for Iran
20th-century Iranian people
Iranian expatriate footballers
Expatriate footballers in Qatar
Iranian expatriate sportspeople in Qatar